Robert Eachus Doan (July 23, 1831 – February 24, 1919) was an American lawyer and politician who served as a U.S. Representative from Ohio for one term from 1891 to 1893.

Biography
Born near Wilmington, Ohio, Doan attended common schools there and completed an academic course. He taught for three years in southern Ohio. He graduated from the Cincinnati Law School in 1857 and was admitted to the bar that same year, commencing practice in Wilmington, Ohio.

Doan was editor of the Wilmington Watchman in 1859 and 1860. He served as prosecuting attorney of Clinton County in 1862.

Doan was elected as a Republican to the Fifty-second Congress (March 4, 1891 – March 3, 1893). After his unsuccessful candidacy for renomination in 1892 he resumed the practice of law in Washington, D.C.

Doan died in Wilmington, Ohio on February 24, 1919. His remains are interred at the Sugar Grove Cemetery.

Sources

1831 births
1919 deaths
People from Wilmington, Ohio
County district attorneys in Ohio
University of Cincinnati College of Law alumni
19th-century American politicians
Republican Party members of the United States House of Representatives from Ohio